Cabomba caroliniana is an aquatic perennial herbaceous plant native to North and South America.

It is a weed of national significance in Australia and on the list of invasive alien species of union concern in the EU. The latter implies that the species cannot be traded nor commercialised. Additionally, if you already had the plant in your possession before the Regulation entered into force, you should take appropriate measures to avoid the species spreading beyond your property.

Common names
Cabomba caroliniana is commonly called  Carolina fanwort, Carolina water shield, green cabomba, fanwort, fish grass, and Washington grass.

Distribution
It is native to southeastern South America (southern Brazil, Paraguay, Uruguay, and northeastern Argentina), and the East and West Coasts of the United States. It is eaten as a vegetable in some areas.

Ecological aspects
This species grows rooted in the mud of stagnant to slow-flowing water, including streams, smaller rivers, lakes, ponds, sloughs, and ditches. In some states in the United States, it is now regarded as a weed. Fanwort stems become brittle in late summer, which causes the plant to break apart, facilitating its distribution and invasion of new water bodies. It produces by seed, but vegetative reproduction seems to be its main vehicle for spreading to new waters. Growth of  a day has been reported in Lake Macdonald in Queensland, Australia.

Large numbers of plants are sent from Florida to the rest of the U.S. for commercial use. Fanwort is also grown commercially in Asia for export to Europe and other parts of the world. Small-scale, local cultivation occurs in some areas, and aquarists are probably responsible for some introductions.

Description
Fanwort is a submerged, sometimes floating, but often rooted, freshwater perennial plant with short, fragile rhizomes. The erect shoots are upturned extensions of the horizontal rhizomes. The shoots are grass-green to olive-green or sometimes reddish-brown. The leaves are of two types: submerged and floating. The submerged leaves are finely divided and arranged in pairs on the stem. The floating leaves, when present, are linear and inconspicuous, with an alternate arrangement. The leaf blade attaches to the centre, where a slight constriction is seen.

References

Further reading 
 Ørgaard, M. (1991). The genus Cabomba (Cabombaceae) - a taxonomic study. Nordic Journal of Botany 11: 179-203
 Gleason, H.A. and A. Cronquist. 1991. Manual of Vascular Plants of Northeastern United States and Adjacent Canada. The New York Botanical Garden, Bronx, New York.
 Hotchkiss, N. 1972. Common Marsh, Underwater and Floating-leaved Plants of the United States and Canada. Dover Publications, Inc., New York.
 Radford, A.E., H.E. Ahles, and C.R. Bell. 1968. Vascular Flora of the Carolinas. The University of North Carolina Press, Chapel Hill.
 Riemer, D.N. and R.D. Ilnicki. 1968. Overwintering of Cabomba in New Jersey. Weed Science 16:101-102.

External links
 Tropica
 Center for Aquatic and Invasive Plants
 Fanwort invasion in Washington waters
 Age of Aquariums
 Missouri plants

Nymphaeales
Freshwater plants
Flora of the Amazon
Flora of the Southeastern United States
Flora of Alabama
Flora without expected TNC conservation status